Juan Carlos Ferrero defeated Martin Verkerk in the final, 6–1, 6–3, 6–2 to win the men's singles tennis title at the 2003 French Open.

Albert Costa was the defending champion, but lost in the semifinals to Ferrero in a rematch of the previous year's final.

This is the last major where future world No. 1 Roger Federer lost in the first round. He retired 19 years later at the 2022 Laver Cup

Seeds

Qualifying

Draw

Finals

Top half

Section 1

Section 2

Section 3

Section 4

Bottom half

Section 5

Section 6

Section 7

Section 8

External links
Official Roland Garros 2003 Men's Singles Draw
Main Draw
Qualifying Draw
2003 French Open – Men's draws and results at the International Tennis Federation

Men's Singles
French Open by year – Men's singles
French Open